Sparkill, formerly known as Tappan Sloat, is a suburban hamlet and census-designated place in the Town of Orangetown, Rockland County, New York, United States located north of Palisades; east of Tappan; south of Piermont and west of the Hudson River. As of the 2010 census, the CDP had a population of 1,565. The hamlet is home to St. Thomas Aquinas College and the Dominican Sisters of Sparkill.

Geography
Sparkill is located at 41°3′52″N 73°57′25″W. According to the United States Census Bureau, the CDP has a total area of 0.529 square mile, all  land.

Demographics

As of the 2010 census, there were 1,565 people, 503 homes, and 415 families in Sparkill. The population density was 2,958 persons per square mile. The racial makeup of the CDP was 83.2% White, 2.0% African American, 0.1% Native American, 9.8% Asian, 2.5% from other races, and 2.4% from two or more races. Hispanic or Latino of any race were 12.2% of the population.

There were 504 households, out of which 46.4% had children under the age of 18 living with them, 67.3% were married couples living together, and 17.7% were non-families. 30% of households had individuals over the age of 65. The average household size was 3.11 persons. The median age was 39.9 years.

The median income for a household in the CDP was $77,440, and the median income for a family was $123,750. About 17.6% of all families, or 16.5% of the population were below the poverty line, including 27.7% of those under the age of 18 and 5.5% of those above the age of 65.

Transportation

Important thoroughfares in Sparkill are U.S. Route 9W, New York State Route 340, and Rockland County Route 8. The hamlet is located approximately 3.5 miles south of the Tappan Zee Bridge and 13.9 miles north of the George Washington Bridge.

Public transportation to Sparkill is served by Rockland Coaches, also known as Red and Tan Lines, operated by Coach USA. Rockland Coaches Route 9A connects Sparkill to the George Washington Bridge Bus Terminal, while Route 9T serves the Port Authority Bus Terminal in New York City. All bus service operates from Depot Square, off of Main Street.

Sparkill used to be served by the Northern Branch of the Erie Railroad, with service to Pavonia Terminal in Jersey City, New Jersey. Passenger service was discontinued in 1966.

Tourism

Historical markers
 Fremont Monument, Rockland Cemetery - Kings Highway
 Hopson Swan Estate - (NRHP)
 Saint Charles A.M.E. Zion Church - 432 Valentine Avenue
 Stonehurst - 65 Rockland Road

Landmarks and places of interest

 Hopson-Swan Estate - 1850
 John Moore's Mill - Site on Sparkill Creek below Route 9W Viaduct, Sparkill-In early 19th century John Moore, an African American, operated a saw and grist mill and from 1810–15, a caning mill. 
 Rockland Cemetery - 201 Kings Highway - The cemetery was created in 1847, by Eleazar Lord, author, educator and first president of the Erie Railroad. Buried here are veterans of the American Civil War and later wars; John Charles Frémont, the Pathfinder; engineer Henry Honychurch Gorringe, and local physician Dr. George A. Leitner.
 Saint Charles A.M.E. Zion Church - 432 Valentine Avenue - Built in 1865.
 Tallman Mountain State Park - Route 9W
 The Christ Episcopal Church of Piermont - 416 Valentine Avenue - This stone church was built in 1865. It is Rockland’s first established Episcopal Church. The first service was held in 1847 in a converted warehouse. Christ Church was designed by the Rev. Charles Babcock, one of the preeminent architects in America at that time, and a founder of the American Institute of Architects provided the plans for the church at no charge. The church with its Gothic Revival architecture and Norman-influenced interior, Christ Episcopal Church is quite similar to the many small "chapel-churches" found in the English or Irish countryside. It retains an original chapel altar installed in 1898, and its stone façade is accented by a stained-glass rose window.  The window was obtained by the church in 1938 from the Former Wayside Chapel in Grand View-on-Hudson when the chapel was converted to a private residence.
 Rockland Country Club
 St. Thomas Aquinas College
 Sparkill Creek

See also

 List of census-designated places in New York

References

External links

 Historical Markers and War Memorials in Sparkill, New York

Hamlets in New York (state)
Census-designated places in Rockland County, New York
Census-designated places in New York (state)
Hamlets in Rockland County, New York